William Banister (1855–1928) was an Anglican missionary.

William Banister may also refer to:

William Banister (judge) (died 1721), British judge
William Guy Banister (1901–1964), FBI agent and private investigator

See also
Billy Bannister (1879–1942), English footballer
William Banester, MP for Lancaster